Allogamy or cross-fertilization is the fertilization of an ovum from one individual with the spermatozoa of another. By contrast, autogamy is the term used for self-fertilization. In humans, the fertilization event is an instance of allogamy. Self-fertilization occurs in hermaphroditic organisms where the two gametes fused in fertilization come from the same individual. This is common in plants (see Sexual reproduction in plants) and certain protozoans.

In plants, allogamy is used specifically to mean the use of pollen from one plant to fertilize the flower of another plant and usually synonymous with the term "cross-fertilization" or "cross-pollination" (outcrossing). The latter term can be used more specifically to mean pollen exchange between different plant strains or even different plant species (where the term cross-hybridization can be used) rather than simply between different individuals.

Parasites having complex life cycles can pass through alternate stages of allogamous and autogamous reproduction, and the description of a hitherto unknown allogamous stage can be a significant finding with implications for human disease.

Avoidance of inbreeding depression
Allogamy ordinarily involves cross-fertilization between unrelated individuals leading to the masking of deleterious recessive alleles in progeny.  By contrast, close inbreeding, including self-fertilization in plants and automictic parthenogenesis in hymenoptera, tends to lead to the harmful expression of deleterious recessive alleles (inbreeding depression).

In dioecious plants, the stigma may receive pollen from several different potential donors.  As multiple pollen tubes from the different donors grow through the stigma to reach the ovary, the receiving maternal plant may carry out pollen selection favoring pollen from less related donor plants. Thus post-pollination selection may occur in order to promote allogamy and avoid inbreeding depression.  Also, seeds may be aborted selectively depending on donor–recipient relatedness.

See also
Heterosis
Outcrossing
Self-incompatibility in plants

References

Reproduction